The Responsible Gambling Fund (RGF) advises the Government of New South Wales (NSW) in Australia on the allocation of funds for initiatives and programs that support responsible gambling and reduce gambling addiction in the state. 

The RGF was established under the Casino Control Act of 1992, which requires each casino license in NSW to contribute to the fund, currently set at 2% of gaming revenue.

Office of Responsible Gambling 
The Office of Responsible Gambling is part of the NSW Department of Customer Service and leads the development of responsible gambling strategy and public policy advice to the NSW Government. It supports and manages the RGF, Club, grants Category 3, and Community Development Fund.

RGF Trustees
The RGF is administered by nine Trustees who meet at least six times a year to advise the Minister on appropriate allocation of funds and on gambling policy. The Trustees are:

John Dalzell (Chair) - chair of Denton' global litigation and dispute resolution group 
Dr. Clive Allcock - psychiatrist and founding member of the National Association for Gambling Studies
Professor Paul Delfabbro - gambling researcher and a lecturer in Psychology at the University of Adelaide
Dr. Greg Hugh - psychiatrist and clinical director of Dubbo Hospital's mental health inpatient unit
Elizabeth Lyne - accountant and auditor in public practice and commercial accounting 
Mark McCrindle - social researcher and founder of McCrindle Research
Janett Milligan - senior executive from  NSW Government
Professor Joel Negin - head of the University of Sydney's School of Public Health 
Paul Newson - formerly the Deputy Secretary of Liquor, Gaming & Racing

RGF-funded projects and initiatives
In 2018/19, $30 million was committed from the RGF to support responsible gambling in NSW. The Responsible Gambling Fund priority areas for 2018 - 2021 are:

A research agenda to formulate responsible gambling policy and initiatives
Investing in community education 
Providing support and counseling services for people experiencing gambling issues and their family members and friends
Assisting the regulator to develop gambling policy

The RGF also funds Gambling Help NSW which provides support and advice for anyone with gambling problems :

 Phone counseling 24 hours a day, 7 days a week
 Face-to-face gambling counseling available in 270 locations across NSW
 Online chat with a gambling counselor via live online chat or email 24/7
 Specific support services for women, Aboriginal and/or Torres Strait Islander persons or people from multicultural communities
 Financial counseling and legal hep 
 Information and tools relating to gambling

RGF-funded campaigns

2018, 2019 - "Responsible Gambling Awareness Week" 16–22 September 2019: An annual RGF initiative to increase awareness of gambling and gambling harm in the NSW community. 
2017, 2018, 2019 - "Show some Briquette": An RGF advertising campaign designed to demonstrate responsible gambling to young males aged 18–35, considered at risk of developing a gambling problem in the context of online sports betting.
2014 - "Talk ward": An RGF social media campaign encouraging problem gamblers and family and friends of problem gamblers to address gambling issues, provide support to one another and share information about gambling support and resources available in NSW.
2014, 2015, 2016 - "Stronger Than You Think": The RGF contracted advertising agency Loud to produce a campaign promoting seeking help for problem gambling as a strength rather than weakness.
2012 - "What's gambling really costing you?": The RGF contracted Why Documentaries to produce a campaign for Multicultural Health Communication Services.
2008 - "Gambling Hangover": The RGF contracted The Campaign Palace to develop a campaign aimed at males between the ages of 18-24. The campaign focused on the "morning after" experience of a problem gambler.

External links 

 [https://www.responsiblegambling.nsw.gov.au
 Responsible Gambling Fund
 Club grants Category 3
 Community Development Fund

References

Gambling and society
Gambling in Australia